The Formerly Utilized Sites Remedial Action Program (FUSRAP) is a United States Army Corps of Engineers (USACE) project to manage and cleanup environmental contamination that resulted from early United States Atomic Energy Commission activities.  Cleanup activities were initially performed under the supervision of the United States Department of Energy (DOE), until 1997 when the United States Congress passed authority for cleanup activities to the USACE.

The primary source of contamination at the locations stems from the processing of uranium ores and the disposal of the byproducts.  The major sources of site contamination are uranium, thorium, and radium.  In addition to the radiological contaminants there are semi-volatile organic compounds, volatile organic compounds, and heavy metals comingled at the sites.

Table of FUSRAP Sites
Data from multiple sources

References

External links 
Saint Louis FUSRAP Site
Buffalo District FUSRAP Webpage
North Atlantic/NY fusrap

Radioactive waste
United States Army Corps of Engineers
Nuclear weapons infrastructure of the United States